Colleen Callaghan (died April 6, 2020) was an Academy Awards-nominated hair stylist who has been nominated twice for Academy Award for Best Makeup and Hairstyling. She worked on over 120 films and TV shows during her long career.

In 2004, she received a lifetime achievement award from the Hollywood Makeup Artist and Hair Stylist Guild Awards. Callaghan died in April 2020.

Oscar nominations

Both were in the category of  Academy Award for Best Makeup and Hair.

68th Academy Awards, nominated for Roommates. Nomination shared with Greg Cannom and Bob Laden. Lost to Braveheart.
74th Academy Awards, nominated for A Beautiful Mind. Nomination shared with Greg Cannom. Lost to ''The Lord of the Rings: The Fellowship of the Ring. '

References

External links

1931 births
2020 deaths
Place of birth missing
Best Makeup BAFTA Award winners
American make-up artists